Ceratophyllum demersum, commonly known as hornwort, rigid hornwort, coontail, or coon's tail, is a species of Ceratophyllum. It is a submerged, free-floating aquatic plant, with a cosmopolitan distribution, native to all continents except Antarctica. It is a harmful introduced weed in New Zealand. It is also a popular aquarium plant.

Description
The leaves are produced in whorls of six to twelve, each leaf 8–40 mm long, simple, or forked into two to eight thread-like segments edged with spiny teeth; they are stiff and brittle. It is monoecious, with separate male and female flowers produced on the same plant. The flowers are small, 2 mm long, with eight or more greenish-brown petals; they are produced in the leaf axils. The fruit is a small nut 4–5 mm long, usually with three spines, two basal and one apical, 1–12 mm long. Plants with the two basal nut spines very short are sometimes distinguished as Ceratophyllum demersum var. apiculatum (Cham.) Asch., and those with no basal spines sometimes distinguished as Ceratophyllum demersum var. inerme Gay ex Radcl.-Sm. It can form turions: buds that sink to the bottom of the water that stay there during the winter and form new plants in spring.

Distribution and habitat
Ceratophyllum demersum grows in lakes, ponds, and quiet streams with summer water temperatures of 15-30 °C and a rich nutrient status. In North America, it occurs in the entire US and Canada, except Newfoundland. In Europe, it has been reported as far north as at a latitude of 66 degrees in Norway. Other reported occurrences include China, Siberia (at 66 degrees North), Burkina Faso and in the Volta River in Ghana (Africa), Vietnam, and New Zealand (introduced). Ceratophyllum demersum grows in still or very slow-moving water.

Invasive status
Hornwort is a declared weed under the Tasmanian Weed Management Act 1999 in Tasmania, Australia, and is classed as an unwanted organism in New Zealand.

Ecology
C. demersum has allelopathic qualities as it excretes substances that inhibit the growth of phytoplankton and cyanobacteria (blue-green algae). Its dense growth can outcompete native underwater vegetation, leading to loss of biodiversity. In New Zealand, it has caused problems with hydroelectric power plants.

Cultivation and uses
This species is often used as a floating freshwater plant in both coldwater and tropical aquaria. Though without roots, it may attach itself to the substrate or objects in the aquarium. Its fluffy, filamentous, bright-green leaves provide excellent cover for newly hatched fish. It is propagated by cuttings. It is frequently used as a model organism for studies of plant physiology. One of the reasons for this is that it allows studies on shoot effects without influence of a root, which often makes interpretation of nutrition and toxicity experiments difficult in terrestrial plants. As it is free floating and therefore does not require a solid substrate, it has been used successfully in the biological life support systems "Aquarack/CEBAS" and "Omegahab" on space flights  Hornwort plants or the epiphytes they support have been shown to degrade the herbicide atrazine.

In aquaria this plant appears to drop all its leaves when exposed to products designed to kill snails. The stems can recover relatively quickly, growing new leaves within a few weeks.

References

External links

demersum
Freshwater plants
Flora of Europe
Flora of Asia
Flora of Africa
Flora of North America
Flora of South America
Flora of Australia
Plants described in 1753
Taxa named by Carl Linnaeus